The 8th Battalion (Parachute), Royal Ranger Regiment, better known as the 8 RRD or 8 RRD (Para) – abbreviation from its local name, is a battalion-sized airborne infantry from the Royal Ranger Regiment of the Malaysian Army. On 10 October 1994 the 8 RRD became part of the 10th Parachute Brigade. The 8 RRD is the first infantry unit in the Malaysian Army transformed from a conventional to an airborne unit.

History

Set up as infantry training centre 
The unit was established on 1 March 1973, in response to a request from the Government of Sarawak to set up a military element in the Malaysian Army consisting of only Sarawakians. Named as 8th Ranger, its first role was as a training centre for the Ranger Regiment. Until 1973 Wellington Camp, Terendak, Malacca was the headquarters for the 1st Battalion, Royal New Zealand Infantry Regiment (1RNZIR). The Commonwealth transferred the camp to the Malaysian Government in early 1973. The 8 RRD was the first local military unit based there.

On 12 March 1973, 500 recruits from Sarawak begin their six-month basic training at the newly formed training centre. On 4 September, the Malaysian Army dissolved the 8th Rangers as a training centre and reinstated it back as a full infantry battalion.

Re-construct to infantry role 
The Malaysian Army reinstated it as the 8th Battalion, Malaysian Ranger Regiment. Only some from 500 Sarawakian recruits stayed after they graduated from the training centre. Some posted to other units, and some officers and soldiers from other units volunteered to the newly formed battalion, thus the plan to set up a 100% Sarawakian military unit was not achieved. In November 1973, the battalion moved out from Wellington Camp and stationed in Sarawak.

Re-construct to airborne role 
Since the early 1970s the Malaysian Army had been planning to create an infantry brigade with parachute ability. However, the plan did not receive much support from the government due to concerns that such an airborne brigade might be looked on with suspicion by its neighbour, Singapore. On 1 January 1987, the Malaysian Army gave the green light for the 8 RRD to be re-constructed as an infantry airborne unit, possibly as an experimental airborne infantry element. The official name of 8 RRD changed to the current name — 8th Battalion (Parachute). The transition went smoothly and, in July 1990, the 8 RRD (Para) became a fully operational airborne infantry battalion. Later that year two more infantry battalions were given permission to re-construct into airborne battalions: 9th Battalion and 17th Battalion of the Royal Malay Regiment.

Airborne infantry pioneers 

Also known as 'The Pioneer', one officer and nine other ranks is the first batch from conventional infantry unit to passes the Airborne Course at Special Warfare Training Centre in the year 1987. They are:

 Lieutenant Colonel Awie Suboh (retired as Lieutenant General Dato')
 Sergeant Marok
 Sergeant Gindu
 Corporal Jang
 Corporal Eddy
 Lance corporal George
 Ranger Ransi
 Ranger Francis
 Ranger Liban
 Ranger Richard

Re-organized to Rapid Deployment Force 

The Malaysian Armed Forces intended to re-organize all military unit with airborne ability under one command. At the end of 1992, the 8 RRD (Para), at that time a part of the 10th Strategic Brigade of the Malaysian Army's 11th Division (Strategic) (Abbr.: 11 Div Stra), was invitated to become part of an independent military unit called the Rapid Deployment Force. On 10 October 1994, the 8 RRD (Para) officially was recognized as one of the three airborne infantry element in the Rapid Deployment Force, and the 10th Strategic Brigade was upgrading to an airborne brigade, the 10th Parachute Brigade.

Female paratroopers 

To experiment with the effectiveness of female paratroopers in airborne combat roles, the Malaysian Army allowed a batch of female soldiers to enters Airborne School and Basic Rapid Deployment Course ( — APAC) of 10th Parachute Brigade. Ten female paratroopers passed the course and were experimentally attached to the 8 RRD (Para) from 30 December 2005 to 22 August 2008. The pioneer female paratroopers were:

 Ranger Hazlinah Saiful
 Ranger Quenty Ajie
 Ranger Pria Grey
 Ranger Agilendeswiraraj Moganaraja
 Ranger Norbaizura Md Nordin
 Ranger Noreen A. Kadir
 Ranger Nurul Sakinnah Ahmad
 Ranger Rosmidah Suman
 Ranger Siti Hajar Yaakub — Killed during parachuting exercise on 2 December 2007
 Ranger Suraya Ali

Formation

Current formation 
The 8 RRD (Para) is based at Wellington Camp, Terendak, Malacca since November 1984. There are 7 paratrooper companies and 1 welfare organisation under 8 RRD.

Disbanded units

Ngelaban Platoon, 8 Ranger 
The Platun Ngelaban ('Lightning Platoon') of the 8 Ranger was a strike team for the 8 Ranger. Each battalion in the Ranger Regiment has their own Platun Ngelaban. This platoon disbanded on 8 August 1978 and succeeded by the UCIS Platoon, 8 Ranger. Became famous after one of its members awarded with the 2nd highest award for valour in Malaysia – the Star of the Commander of Valour ( – PGB).

UCIS Platoon, 8 Ranger 
The Unit Combat Intelligence Section (UCIS) Platoon of the 8 Ranger was a combat intelligence and reconnaissance platoon for the 8 RRD. This platoon became famous after two of its members awarded with the 2nd highest award for valour in Malaysia – the Star of the Commander of Valour (PGB). Established on 8 August 1978, this platoon is the successor for Platun Ngelaban, gets its fame during military operations in Perak-Kelantan borders in the year 1979 to 1980. Later, all UCIS Platoons in Malaysian Army disbanded and replaced with Reconnaissance Platoon and Sniper Platoon.

Customs and traditions

Colours 

 Green – Symbolise of battalion's readiness
 Red – Symbolise of always prepared

Uniforms 
Rifle green beret with black hackle

 The rifle green beret and black hackle symbolised the light infantry status of the Royal Ranger Regiment. The Malaysian Ranger Regiment (the then name for Royal Ranger Regiment) functions initially as light infantry and scouts thus, the regiment influenced by the Royal Irish Fusiliers (later become Royal Irish Rangers in 1968) of British Army. Today, non-RDF trained members of 8 RRD (Para) wore this beret. Before 10 October 1994, all 8 RRD members wore this beret.

Maroon beret

 The maroon beret symbolised the airborne ability of this battalion. The Parachute Regiment of the British Army heavily influenced the Malaysian Army airborne force establishment. All RDF trained 8 RRD members to start wearing this beret since 10 October 1994.

Ceremonial objects 
HRH Putra of Perlis' Bronze Cup

 The main ceremonial objects of the 8 RRD (Para). Granted by HRH Putra of Perlis to 8 RRD on 5 October 1989. The bronze cup symbolised the battalion's readiness to bear any responsibility given by higher command to them.

Battalion's steel helmet

 Steel helmet is a military attire that hand out by the Malaysian Army to military units that attached under Rajang Area Security Command (RASCOM) during Communist insurgency in Sarawak. 8 RRD stationed there for a few years. 8 RRD silver plated a steel helmet and made it as battalion's ceremonial objects.

Ceremonial weapon

 The ceremonial weapon of 8 RRD (Para) is a silver kris. Granted by HRH Putra of Perlis on 29 June 1999 to celebrate 8 RRD become a part of a Malaysian Army elite unit. Symbolised of a warrior.

Commander's parachute wings

 The latest ceremonial objects for 8 RRD (Para). It is a ceremonial object granted by the 24th Commander of 8 RRD, Lieutenant Colonel Zulkifli Raub, on 1 March 2020 to the battalion because of the 8 RRD is the pioneer airborne element in the 10th Parachute Brigade.

Killed in the line of duty

Notable battles

Battle of Mount Penrissen 1975 
On 2 October 1975, a section from Ngelaban Platoon, 8 Ranger led by Sergeant Gandat Merdan were conducting a manhunt mission at Mount Penrissen, Sarawak, near to Malaysia-Indonesia border. The section split into two teams, the main team and one small patrol team consisting of three soldiers, Ranger Beliang, Ranger Frederick and Ranger Baru. The team of three soldiers then came across an enemy camp. While the team was scouting the camp, the enemy ambushed them. Even though outnumbered, Ranger Beliang led the team and killed one enemy. Hearing the sound of a gunfight, Sergeant Gandat with the main team came to give fire support and defeat the rest of the enemy. Later, they found that the enemy killed by Ranger Beliang is Lee Lip Pong, the leader Sarawak Communist and the most wanted person in Sarawak. Ranger Beliang was promoted to the rank of Lance Corporal for this battle. He was later awarded with the second-highest decorations for valour, the Star of the Commander of Valour for heroism at the Battle of Gopeng 1977.

Battle of Gopeng 1977 
In December 1977, during Operation Tanduk at Gopeng, Perak, Captain Patrick Wong Sing Nang led a squad of 10 men conducting a routine patrol in the jungle. He split his squad into two smaller 5-men teams, and the second team is a recce team led by Sergeant Gandat Merdan. When patrolling, Captain Patrick Wong and his 5-men team were under attack. He has been shot at the chest and three others seriously wounded from been shot. Only Lance Corporal Beliang unharmed. During the panic, one soldier from Sergeant Gandat's team wounded after step on a booby trap. Captain Patrick Wong then ask for medevac via helicopter. While waiting for medevac, Lance Corporal Beliang is alone defending his injured teammates from enemies fire. Even though he is seriously injured, Captain Patrick Wong stays with Lance Corporal Beliang and they providing cover fire for the medevac. He is the last man among the casualties been evacuated. Because he prioritises his men over himself, Captain Patrick Wong is mentioned in dispatches (Malay: Kepujian Perutusan Keberanian — KPK) by His Majesty the King of Malaysia. Lance Corporal Beliang Bali awarded with the second-highest decorations for valour, the Star of the Commander of Valour (PGB) for his heroic defending his injured teammates.

Raid on Korbu Reserve Forest 1979 
On 1 June 1979, the UCIS Platoon of 8 Ranger led by Second Lieutenant Govinda Raj Kanappan and one company from 8 Ranger led by Captain Othman conducting a raid on enemy camp in Korbu Reserve Forest, Fort Legap, Perak. The UCIS Platoon split into two groups. The second group is a recce team led by Sergeant Kanang Langkau. One of recce's member is Corporal Micheal Riman. The recce team went ahead to scouts the area and markings the enemy sentries' locations. Captain Othman and his soldiers approaching the recce team before raiding the camp. The recce team initiated the raid after Sergeant Kanang shoots a sentry with an M79 grenade launcher. Even though outnumbered, the recce team managed to capture the camp, with the cover fire support from Captain Othman's company. Corporal Micheal Riman has been shot at his right arm. During the raid, they killed five enemies, while losing two soldiers. Sergeant Kanang and Corporal Micheal Riman awarded with the second-highest decorations for valour, the Star of the Commander of Valour (PGB) for this raid.

Battle of Tanah Hitam 1980 
In February 1980, Sergeant Kanang Langkau commanding a platoon from Charlie Company, 8 Ranger for a manhunt mission at Tanah Hitam, Chemor, Perak. The platoon came across a group of enemy and manages to kill one. A few days later, on 19 February, Sergeant Kanang spotted a booby trap. While stopping to check the trap, a group of enemy ambushed the Sergeant Kanang's platoon. The ambush injured three members of the platoon, a sergeant, a medic and Sergeant Kanang. Even though been shot at chest and stomach, Sergeant Kanang takes the command and led his platoon to counter the ambush and won the battle. Sergeant Kanang awarded with the highest decorations for valour, the Grand Knight of Valour for this battle.

List of Commanders

Notable members

Kanang Langkau 

Warrant Officer I (Rtd.) Temenggung Datuk Kanang anak Langkau, (2 March 1945–3 January 2013) was the most well-known Malaysian heroes. He won the highest Malaysian decorations for valour, the Grand Knight of Valour ( — SP) and the second-highest military award, the Star of the Commander of Valour ( — PGB) during two operations at Perak-Kelantan borders in 1979 and 1980. He was the only Malaysian awarded with both decorations. Born in Sarikei, Sarawak, he enlisted to British Army on 21 April 1962 (at that time, British rules Sarawak). Kanang assigned to the 42 Commando as Iban Tracker (Scouts unit that only consists of soldiers from Sarawak) during Communist insurgency in Malaysia (1968–1989). He later transferred to the 1st Battalion, Royal New Zealand Infantry Regiment (1RNZIR) and then absorbed to the Malaysian Army in 1973. He was the UCIS Platoon 8 Ranger's Platoon sergeant and 8 RRD's Regimental sergeant major. After retiring from armed services with the rank of Warrant Officer I (WO1; NATO: OR-9), he then elected as the Temenggung ('Paramount Leader') of Iban people.

Micheal Riman Bugat 
Major (Rtd.) Quartermaster Micheal Riman anak Bugat, (born on 8 March 1954, in Saribas, Sarawak) is one of the Malaysian heroes from the Malaysian Army. He won the Star of the Commander of Valour (PGB) during Raid on Korbu Reserve Forest 1979 in Perak. At that time, his rank is corporal and together with Sergeant Kanang Anak Langkau, they are members of UCIS Platoon, 8 Ranger. Enlisted to Malaysian Army on 22 June 1973, he then assigned to the 8 Ranger. He later commissioned as an officer. Retired from the Malaysian Army with the rank of Major Quartermaster (NATO: OF-3) after serving for 31 years.

Beliang Bali 
Warrant Officer I (Rtd.) Beliang anak Bali, (born on 6 October 1953, in Sri Aman, Sarawak) is one of the Malaysian heroes from the Malaysian Army. He won the Star of the Commander of Valour (PGB) during Battle of Gopeng 1977 in Perak. During the battle, Lance Corporal Beliang, who is a members of Ngelaban Platoon, and his 5-men team came under attack by communist terrorist. Except him, all of his teammates have an injury, including the commanding officer, Captain Wong Sing Nang. With the help en route, Lance Corporal Beliang is alone while defending his injured teammates from the insurgents while waiting for incoming help. He retired from the Malaysian Army with the rank of Warrant Officer I (WO1; NATO: OR-9) after serving for 21 years.

Awie Suboh 
Lieutenant General (Rtd.) Dato' Awie bin Suboh, (born in 1953, in Sri Aman, Sarawak) is the first Sarawakian be promoted to a 3-star general in the Malaysian Armed Forces. He enters the armed forces on 1 December 1972. Commissioned as an army officer on 15 May 1975, his first unit is 4th Battalion, Malaysian Ranger Regiment. He later volunteers and passes the commando course. Awie assigned as the Commander of 8 RRD after promoted to the rank of lieutenant colonel. In 1987, Awie and 9 other ranks from 8 RRD pass airborne course and became the pioneer infantry paratrooper in the Malaysian Army. He then became the Commander of 9th Infantry Brigade in 2004, and later as the Commander of 21st Special Service Group in 2006. He retired as the Commander of 1st Division (1 Div) on 13 November 2011, with the rank of Lieutenant-general (NATO: OF-8) after serving for 38 years, 11 months and 12 days. His past positions including Deputy Chief of Army.

References 

Malaysian Army
Airborne units and formations
Military units and formations established in the 1970s